Lucknow Metro is a mass rapid transit (MRT) system in Lucknow, Uttar Pradesh, India. The metro is owned and operated by the Uttar Pradesh Metro Rail Corporation (UPMRC).

History
The original design of the metro project included one north-south and one east-west corridor, with links through Gomti Nagar.

The length of the ramps between the elevated and below ground sections would total . Passengers would be served by a total of 22 stations, with 19 elevated and 3 below ground. Following Charbagh station, the line descends underground where ,  (Uttar Pradesh Secretariat) and  stations are located.

Originally, the metro trains were to be housed in one of two depots, a  depot at Vasant Kunj and another at the airport, but due to security concerns the airport depot was removed from the plan.

In 2013, a report published by the Department of Housing and Urban Planning of the Government of Uttar Pradesh resulted in major changes to the metro project. The two corridor design was scrapped and replaced with one featuring a denser network of connectivity. This revision resulted in the layout of route being entirely elevated with no underground sections. The increased coverage of the metro would raise the cost of the project but reduced the operating cost per km. The underground design also raised concerns about safety as well as increased energy consumption. The report also proposed the construction of an elevated Bus Rapid Transit System (BRTS) as a feeder service to the metro.

Project timeline

 September 2008: DMRC submits a concept paper after the Lucknow metro rail project is proposed by the Government of Uttar Pradesh headed by chief minister Mayawati.
 February 2009: An agreement is signed between DMRC and LDA.
 June 2013: The state cabinet headed by chief minister Akhilesh Yadav gives clearance for the metro rail network. The state cabinet also gave approval for the creation of Lucknow Metro Rail Corporation.
 August 2013: Government of Uttar Pradesh approves the revised Detailed Project Report (DPR) submitted by DMRC.
 October 2013: LMRC, a special purpose vehicle (SPV) is formed by the Government of Uttar Pradesh to build and operate the Lucknow Metro. The SPV is incorporated under the Companies Act, 1956 on 25 November 2013. Construction Phase to begin in December.
 November 2013: DMRC submits tender for Lucknow Metro work, promises to complete the first phase by Feb 2017.
 December 2013: Government of India, in principle, approves the project.
 March 2014: Foundation stone laid for Lucknow Metro project.
 10 July 2014:  set aside for Lucknow Metro in the union budget, by Minister of Finance, Arun Jaitley.

Red Line
 27 September 2014: Construction begins on the Lucknow Metro.
 6 August 2015: Lucknow Metro receives clearance from Public Investment Board (PIB) of Government of India.
 22 December 2015: Union Cabinet approves construction of Rail Project Phase - 1A.
 30 March 2016: To speed up clearance processes for Lucknow Metro, LMRC becomes a 50:50 joint venture between the Government of India and the Government of Uttar Pradesh. As a result, the LMRC board is reconstituted with five nominee directors being nominated by both Government of India and Government of Uttar Pradesh each, apart from the three full-time directors. Additionally, the Chief Secretary of Uttar Pradesh is replaced by the Union Urban Development Secretary as the ex-officio chairman of LMRC.
 18 September 2016: 90% of the work completed in the construction of Rail Project Phase - 1A.
 20 October 2016: Lucknow metro begins work on Faizabad Road, does Bhoomi puja for Phase 1A Extension.
The inaugural ride was piloted by two women.
 20 June 2017: Fifth metro train set arrives at Transport Nagar depot.
 8 July 2017: Sixth and final metro train set arrives for first phase requirement.
 27–28 July 2017: The Commissioner of Railway Safety (CMRS) performs on-site inspection to confirm readiness of the Metro for service.
 29 August 2017: Inauguration ceremony, on 5 September 2017, confirmed. Announcement that metro trains will run between Transport Nagar and Charbagh.
 23 February 2019: Work on whole of North-South Corridor (Red Line) completed, CMRS approves for commercial run. Full line to be inaugurated on 8 March 2019.
 8 March 2019: Prime Minister Narendra Modi inaugurates full stretch of Red Line of Lucknow Metro.

Blue Line
 Aug 2019: Modified DPR is yet to be approved by state government and also LMRC is yet to get land for Metro deport which is to come up near upcoming .

Current status

Phase I

Funding

Over 50% of the Lucknow Metro rail project is funded through external debt from European Investment Bank. The Lucknow Metro has its own operating body, the Lucknow Metro Rail Corporation, is a Special Purpose Vehicle (SPV) and a 50:50 Joint Venture set-up by the Government of India and Government of Uttar Pradesh. LMRC is headquartered in Vipin Khand, Gomti Nagar, Lucknow.

Infrastructure

Rolling stock
On 5 October 2015, Alstom was awarded a  contract to construct twenty four car EMU for Phase 1A, based on their Metropolis design.
The vehicles are to be constructed at Alstom's factory in Sricity, Andhra Pradesh.

Station facilities
WiFi is available at each station with free access for smart card holders. Other services include free purified drinking water and free toilets.

The north–south corridor of the Lucknow Metro uses an automated fare collection (AFC) system, provided by Datamatics.

Security
Lucknow Metro's security is based on a hybrid model. The Lucknow City Police, which has raised a dedicated squad of 393 personnel for this purpose from PAC, provides general security, which includes frisking, scanning, maintaining and having quick response teams (QRT) as per security norms, while a private security agency provides operational security, which including maintaining hygiene of the station and ensuring that people queue properly.

Personnel from the PAC were especially trained for providing security by the Central Industrial Security Force (CISF) in New Delhi.

Apart from this, CCTV and metal detectors are installed at every metro station.

Ticketing and recharge

Ridership

The cumulative ridership of the metro rail in Lucknow crossed 1 million in the first 70 days of commercial operation; the rapid-transit system received 31,688 passengers on its inaugural day of services, and recorded a ridership of 41,075 on 10 September.

, the daily ridership of Lucknow Metro ranges between 10,000 and 11,000; with monthly ridership being 480,000 in September 2017, 400,000 in October 2017, 300,000 in November and December 2017, and around 300,000 in January, February, March and April 2018. As of 2019, as many as 60,000 people are using metro service on a daily basis in Lucknow.

In popular culture
In January 2017, Hindi film Behen Hogi Teri became the first film to shoot scenes on the metro premises.

Awards
 Lucknow Metro was awarded 2nd Place for 'Best Metro for Excellence in Innovative Designs' at 5th Annual Metro Rail Summit in New Delhi behind the Delhi Metro. It competed against the other metro projects of the country like Mumbai Metro, Jaipur Metro etc.
 Lucknow Metro Rail Corporation (LMRC) was awarded the European Society for Quality Research (ESQR) Choice Prize Award 2016 under the Gold category, a vanity award.
 Lucknow Metro Rail Corporation won the Dun & Bradstreet Infra Award in 2017 in the Metro Rail category  for completing "Priority Corridor" of the North –South Corridor (Phase 1A) and commissioning the project in a record time of less than three years. .
 Lucknow Metro Rail Corporation won the International 'Royal Society for the Prevention of Accidents' (RoSPA) Award. LMRC was given the Silver Award for its Phase 1A (North-South Corridor) in the Project/Infrastructure category for the year 2018.
 Lucknow Metro Rail Corporation was certified with the highest green rating (i.e. the Platinum Rating) by the Indian Green Building Council (IGBC).
 Lucknow Metro Rail Corporation has International Organization for Standardization (ISO) 14001: 2004 & Occupational Health & Safety Assessment Series (OHSAS) 18001: 2007 certificates in recognition of the organisation's integrated management system in compliance with ISO & OHSAS standards and requirements.
 Lucknow Metro Rail Corporation was awarded the "Best Urban Mass Transit" project during the 10th Urban Mobility India Conference & Exhibition and CODATU XVII Conference under Ministry of Housing and Urban Affairs at Hyderabad, Telangana in November 2017.
 Lucknow Metro Rail Corporation's managing director, Kumar Keshav, was awarded with the 'Shaan-E-Lucknow' award by the organisers of the Lucknow Book Fair and a special postal envelope cover bearing the logo, symbol and mnemonic of Lucknow Metro was released.
 Lucknow Metro Rail Corporation won the first Dr APJ Abdul Kalam Memorial Award on Innovation in governance on 15 October 2016.

Network Map

See also

 Urban rail transit in India
 Uttar Pradesh Metro Rail Corporation
 List of Lucknow Metro stations
 Timeline of Lucknow Metro
 Kanpur Metro
 Agra Metro
 Noida Metro
 Uttar Pradesh State Road Transport Corporation
 List of Metro Systems

References

External links

 Official Website of Lucknow Metro
 UrbanRail.Net – descriptions of all metro systems in the world, each with a schematic map showing all stations.

 
Airport rail links in India
Underground rapid transit in India
Japan International Cooperation Agency
Standard gauge railways in India
2017 establishments in Uttar Pradesh